Ash vs Evil Dead is an American comedy horror television series developed by Sam Raimi, Ivan Raimi, and Tom Spezialy for Starz. The series is set in the Evil Dead universe created by Raimi, with Bruce Campbell reprising his role as Ash Williams from the film series. Ray Santiago, Dana DeLorenzo, and Lucy Lawless also star.

The series premiered on October 31, 2015. Three days before the series' premiere, Starz renewed it for a second season, which premiered on October 2, 2016. Starz renewed it for a third season, which premiered on February 25, 2018. The series was cancelled after three seasons on April 29, 2018; however, in July 2022, Campbell confirmed that an animated revival was in active development.

Premise
The series is set approximately 30 years after the first three Evil Dead films, and serves as a sequel to that trilogy. Ash Williams works at the "Value Stop" as a simple stock boy. Also working at the store is his friend Pablo and the object of Pablo's affections, Kelly. Ash has seemingly done very little with his life since returning from 1300 AD at the end of Army of Darkness, and the beginning of the series sees him living in a trailer and drinking alone in bars. However, Ash must soon renounce his routine existence and become a hero once more by taking up arms and facing the titular Evil Dead. Pablo and Kelly decide to join him on his quest to save humanity.

Cast

Main
 Bruce Campbell as Ash Williams: Ash has changed in the 30 years since Army of Darkness. In an interview with Entertainment Weekly, Campbell stated, "Ash has survivor's guilt. You could have a heyday with his PTSD. He's a war vet. He doesn't want to talk about it, and he'll lie about that stump on his hand to impress the ladies. This is a guy who's got some issues. He's emotionally stunted. But, he's the guy you want in the foxhole next to you." Over the course of season one, it is revealed that following the events of the film trilogy, Ash spent thirty years drifting from town to town, living in a mobile home trailer, with his pet lizard, Eli, and working a series of dead-end jobs at different branches of Value Stop. Ash has attempted to destroy the Necronomicon on multiple occasions. Unable to be rid of the book, he instead becomes its de facto caretaker. In season two, it is revealed that Ash had returned to his hometown of Elk Grove, Michigan, after the events of the films. The people of Elk Grove refused to believe his stories of Deadites, and instead accused him of murdering his friends and his sister in the cabin, shunned him, and dubbed him "Ashy Slashy".
 Ray Santiago as Pablo Simon Bolivar: A co-worker who became Ash's loyal sidekick. Pablo believes that Ash is a true hero, and calls him "El Jefe" ("The Boss") as a mark of respect. Santiago describes his character as an "El Jefe in-training". He was raised by his uncle, "el Brujo", a shaman, who told him stories of an evil power which can only be defeated by "El Jefe". He fights valiantly alongside Ash and Kelly before being torn to ribbons by the demon Baal, but was resurrected thereafter. Through a ritual in season 3, Pablo succeeds his uncle as a "brujo especial".
 Dana DeLorenzo as Kelly Maxwell / Sorceress Kaya: An occasionally moody and initially reluctant co-worker of Ash and Pablo, Kelly is dragged into the fight against evil after she is orphaned. She is often described has a spiritual daughter of Ash. Impulsive but really good at fighting and improvisation. She is a crucial membre of the "Ghostbeaters" She and her family are Jewish. Her mother died in a car accident six months prior to the beginning of the series.
 Jill Marie Jones as Amanda Fisher (season 1) A Michigan State Trooper who set out to find Ash following the death of her partner.
 Lucy Lawless as Ruby Knowby / Rebecca Prevett: A mysterious figure who is on a quest to hunt down the source of the recent evil outbreaks.
 Michelle Hurd as Linda Bates-Emery (season 2): Ash's high school girlfriend who is now married to Emery, the sheriff of Elk Grove, and has a daughter, Lacey. She is one of the few people in Elk Grove happy to see Ash return.
 Ted Raimi as Chet Kaminski (season 2): A hard-partying old childhood friend of Ash's who was secretly intimate with Ash's sister, Cheryl, thirty years prior, and pays the ultimate price for it. Raimi had previously appeared throughout the Evil Dead series in various cameo and stand-in roles. 
 Pepi Sonuga as Lacey Emery (season 2): Thomas' and Linda's 17-year-old daughter who becomes possessed by Kandarian spirits and is killed by Kelly.
 Arielle Carver-O'Neill as Brandy Barr Williams (season 3): Ash's long-lost daughter, a smart middle-class American high school senior whose life is upended when she finds herself caught up in violent demonic events that result in her mother's death
 Lindsay Farris as Dalton (season 3): A member of the Knights of Sumeria, an ancient order dedicated to battling evil.

Recurring
 Samara Weaving as Heather (season 1) The sole survivor of a hiking group, she is rescued by Pablo and Kelly when they reach the cabin. She is later indirectly killed by Ruby when the evil is set loose.
 Hemky Madera as El Brujo (season 1, 3) Pablo's shaman uncle, Ash, Pablo and Kelly go to him for help against the Kandarian Demon. He is killed by the demon Eligos when he performs an exorcism on Kelly to release her from Eligos' thrall.
 Lee Majors as Brock Williams (season 2–3) Ash's father, whom Ash has not seen in 30 or so years, since the events of Evil Dead. It is from his father that Ash got his bad habits (debauchery, etc.), and it's hinted that he has stolen girls/women from Ash in the past (i.e. his son's old high school P.E. teacher, Lillian Pendergrast). His day job is as a hardware store owner; his slogan is "Brock Williams - has wood - call me." He blames Ash for the death of his daughter, Cheryl, but then, minutes before being killed by his son's possessed Oldsmobile 88, comes to realize that his boy was actually a hero. He later appears as a spirit to help guide Ash on how to defeat the Deadites. 
 Stephen Lovatt as Sheriff Thomas Emery (season 2) The husband of Linda whom Ash used to pick on in highschool. He is now the strict sheriff of Elk Grove.
 Joel Tobeck as Baal (season 2) A diabolical demon and Ruby's ex-husband who wants the Necronomicon for his own nefarious purposes. His abilities include using lust to manipulate others, possessing human bodies and the ability to slow down time near a target (or just their perception of it) where-in he can converse with or injure said target. When Baal is using this power nobody seems to be able to see him besides the person he is interacting with. Ruby has also mentioned that he is impervious to physical attacks and can only be harmed through mystic or spiritual means.  Ruby also disclosed that she didn't "choose" him when they became a couple, but had used his powers on her.  It isn't clear if he is meant as a nod to the Biblical Baal or the Canaanite Baal.  
Emilia Burns as Zoë (Season 3), a Knight of Sumeria who helps Ash in his crusade.
 Katrina Hobbs as Candace Barr (Season 3), An ex-girlfriend of Ash's who is the mother of their daughter Brandy. Ash married Candace in Branson, Missouri when they were drunk. She was later killed by a deadite before becoming one herself at her own funeral.
 Samantha Young as Natalie (Season 3), A woman who Ruby kidnaps and holds hostage to be a sort-of babysitter for her spawn. She is later killed by the demonic baby.

Special guests
 Rebekkah Farrell as Linda (season 1)
 Ellen Sandweiss returning as Cheryl Williams (season 2) from the original Evil Dead movie.
 Nicholas Hope as Professor Raymond Knowby (season 2)
 Alison Quigan (normal form) and Ted Raimi (Deadite form) as Henrietta Knowby (season 2)
 Kelvin Taylor as an Orderly
 Jeffrey Thomas as Stanley Gibson (season 3)

Production
The series first started life as two competing ideas for a fourth Evil Dead film. However at the time the Raimi brothers did not know how to get funding for the film and so it was instead written as a TV show. Writing for the medium presented new challenges for Sam as he had to make the series accessible to new viewers as well as create new characters to "bounce off of". The project was first officially revealed by Raimi at a surprise appearance at the 2014 San Diego Comic-Con. That November, Starz announced that they officially put an order in for the series. Campbell said the channel was the only network that would give them the ability to be unrated and unrestricted; Campbell has stated that Starz does not require the crew to create alternate, "wimpy" versions for television.

The pilot episode of the series was written by Sam Raimi (who also directed), Ivan Raimi and Tom Spezialy. In February 2015, original film series producer Robert Tapert returned to produce along with Raimi, Campbell and Craig DiGregorio. Ray Santiago and Dana DeLorenzo were cast in the lead roles of Pablo Simon Bolivar and Kelly Maxwell, and Jill Marie Jones was cast as Amanda Fisher, a Michigan State Trooper. In March 2015, Lucy Lawless was cast as Ruby, a mysterious figure who's on a quest to stop the evil outbreak and believes that Ash is the one who's the cause of it. In April 2015, Starz released a new graphic teaser advertising the TV show is coming in the fall of 2015, along with a new poster for the series. Filming commenced in Auckland, New Zealand later that month.

Due to legal issues with Universal Pictures, the events from Army of Darkness could not specifically be mentioned in the first season. In April 2015, the producers made it clear that they wanted to resolve the issue, and in mid-2016, producer Robert Tapert stated that the rights issue had been solved and that references to Army of Darkness would appear from season two onward.

Online hoax
In June 2016, a Facebook user posted a photo of a bruised, bloodied, and scratched Samara Weaving (without identifying that the woman in the image was Weaving or any actress). The photo was accompanied by the caption "The result of Fascism in America...simply because she was a Trump supporter." Although some news outlets clarified that the photo was of Samara Weaving and that she was not really injured, many supporters of then-candidate Donald Trump were convinced that the image was proof of liberal violence against Trump supporters. In support of this misinterpretation of the photo, the post was shared close to 30,000 times. To try to counter this misinformation, Ash vs Evil Dead star Bruce Campbell tweeted, "Check your facts, folks. This is an actress named Samara Weaving from #AshVsEvilDead. This is a make-up test. Sad." Weaving herself tweeted, "I really hate this."

Cancellation and revival
It was announced on April 20, 2018, that Ash vs Evil Dead had been cancelled after a three-season run, with the last episode airing on April 29, 2018. Towards the end of the third season, ratings had declined from the initial 437,000 same-day viewers of the first season to around 175,000 non-DVR viewers. According to Variety, at the time of the eighth episode of the third season's airing, the show averaged a 0.08 rating in adults aged 18 to 49, with approximately 177,000 viewers per episode.

Bruce Campbell stated at the time of the cancellation that "Ash vs. Evil Dead has been the ride of a lifetime. Ash Williams was the role of a lifetime. It was an honor to reunite with Evil Dead partners Rob Tapert and Sam Raimi to give our tireless fans another taste of the outrageous horror/comedy they demanded. I will always be grateful to Starz for the opportunity to revisit the franchise that launched our careers". Following the news of the show's cancellation, fans of the series created petitions to renew Ash vs Evil Dead for a fourth or fifth season. In response to an article published by the website Bloody Disgusting that encouraged fans to campaign for the show's continuation on the Netflix platform, Campbell tweeted "Big props to fans for the effort, but I'm retired as Ash. #timetofrysomeotherfish".

Later Campbell said about the show's cancellation and legacy: “I’m really glad we did it because we saw Ash’s home, we went into his bedroom, we met his girlfriends, we met his daughter that we never knew he had and that he never knew he had, and we met his father, played by the great Lee Majors. I feel we really pushed all the buttons and he fulfilled his destiny written in that ancient book. He was the guy destined to defeat evil in the past, present and future, and he took off with a hot robot chick at the end to go kick in the future. What else do you need? We knew the ratings were bad. We knew, going into the last season, that we had to have an end because we didn’t think Starz was gonna re-up us and we were right. So, thank God we did that."

Campbell and Raimi signed on as producers of the film Evil Dead Rise. True to his earlier statement, Campbell will not star in the project. The cinematographer of Ash vs Evil Dead, Dave Garbett, will serve as cinematographer on Evil Dead Rise.

On July 25, 2022, Campbell announced that an animated revival of Ash vs Evil Dead was in active development, with Campbell returning as the voice of Ash.

Episodes

Season 1 (2015–16)

Season 2 (2016)

Season 3 (2018)

Music
Joseph LoDuca, a frequent Sam Raimi collaborator who composed the scores for the Evil Dead films, contributes the original music for Ash vs Evil Dead. The series also leverages excerpts from various 1970s and '80s popular songs, particularly featuring artists (e.g., Alice Cooper, Ted Nugent and Frijid Pink) from the greater Detroit area where much of the action is based (and where Raimi, Campbell and Tapert grew up). Multiple Deep Purple songs from the 1970s are also used ("Highway Star", "Space Truckin'", "Stormbringer", etc.). In an interview, Sam Raimi states that the music selected for the series is based on the lack of growth of the Ash character over the past 30–35 years, and that "the music should reflect the last time he was engaged in society, and living".

On November 11, 2015, it was announced that the Joseph LoDuca music score entitled Ash vs Evil Dead: Music from the STARZ Original Series would be released by Varèse Sarabande digitally on December 11, 2015, and via audio CD on December 18, 2015. The following are the tracks that are on that album:

Furthermore, in the season two finale, a marching band plays Victory for MSU, the official  fight song of Michigan State University, where Raimi and Tapert attended college.

Reception

Critical response
The first season of Ash vs Evil Dead has received critical acclaim. Review aggregator Rotten Tomatoes gave the season a 98% "Certified Fresh" rating based on 51 reviews, with an average rating of 8.1/10. The site's critical consensus reads: "True to the movies that spawned it, Ash vs Evil Dead is a gory, hilarious, and audacious resurrection of Sam Raimi's beloved horror franchise." Metacritic gave the season a rating of 75 out of 100, based on 25 critics, indicating "generally favorable reviews."

The second season has received critical acclaim. On Rotten Tomatoes, the season has a score of 100%, based on 17 reviews, with an average rating of 8.06/10. The site's critical consensus reads, "Ash vs. Evil Deads sophomore season proves the show is in command of its characters and tone, turning up the gore, fun, and energy to deliver even more grisly, action-packed thrills and laughs." On Metacritic, the season has a rating of 82 out of 100, based on 5 reviews, indicating "universal acclaim."

The third season has received critical acclaim. On Rotten Tomatoes, the season has a score of 100% based on 15 reviews, with an average rating of 8.32/10. The site's critical consensus reads, "Ash vs Evil Deads third and final season rounds out the amiable ensemble with welcome additions and dishes out a series of splatter-filled set pieces, closing the Necronomicon on the series in gleeful fashion".

Accolades

Home media
On August 23, 2016, Starz subsidiary Anchor Bay Entertainment released the first season of the series on Blu-ray and DVD. The second season was released in the fall of 2017. With season 2 onwards, the future releases were done by Lionsgate Home Entertainment after the completion of the Starz/Lionsgate merger on December 8, 2016. The third and final season was released in August 2018. A complete collection with all three seasons was released in October 16, 2018.

References

External links

 
 

2015 American television series debuts
2018 American television series endings
2010s American horror comedy television series
The Evil Dead (franchise)
American action television series
American fantasy television series
English-language television shows
Saturn Award-winning television series
Live action television shows based on films
Television shows about spirit possession
Television shows set in Michigan
Starz original programming
Zombies in television
Television series about viral outbreaks
Demons in television
American sequel television series
Television shows filmed in New Zealand
Television series created by Sam Raimi